Milan Blagojević (born 12 May 1965) in Gračanica is a Serbian jurist, full-time Professor of Constitutional Law and the former judge of the District Court of Banja Luka.

He gained his Bachelor’s degree in Law from the Faculty of Law, University of Sarajevo in 1991, and passed the bar exam in 1994. He earned his Master’s degree in Law Science from the Faculty of Law, University of Banja Luka in 2000 and his PhD degree from the Faculty of Law, University of Belgrade in 2002. He is fluent in English and understands Russian.

His judicial career so far has included positions of  President of the Magistrates’ Court in Petrovo, Ozren, judge of the Military Court in Bijeljina, judge of the Basic Court in Doboj (criminal cases) and judge of the Municipal Court in Travnik (civil cases). He has served as judge of  the District Court in Banja Luka. From July 1, 2012, until July 26, 2021, he served as a judge of the District Court in Banja Luka..

As judge, he took part in several educational programs, some of them international.  In May and June 2002, in Prague, Czech Republic, he completed training for judges called “Judging in a Democratic Society” organized by CEELI Institute and the American Bar Association. In June 2001 he attended educational seminar for judges and prosecutors from Bosnia and Herzegovina concerning the European Convention on Human Rights and its implementation in Bosnia and Herzegovina, organized by the Council of Europe. From 2002 to 2003, he completed the international one-year distance training course for judges called“Towards a Model for a European Judge”, jointly organized by the University of Bologna and Italian Centro per l’Europa centro-orientale e Balcanica. 

In 2003 and 2004 he completed summer seminar of the Legal Reform Program, which is initiative of the Johns Hopkins Center of the University of Bologna, the Faculty of Law of the University of Bologna and the Faculty of Law of the University of Belgrade.

He was chairman of the Municipal Election Commission of the Municipality of Petrovo in a period 1996-2000, and was Head of the Department for General Administration of the Municipality of Petrovo in 2004 and 2005. In 2010 and 2011, he worked as a legal advisor to the Director of the Republic Administration for Geodetic and Property Affairs of the Republic of Srpska. For a short period (2007 and 2008) he worked as Assistant Director of the Center for Education of Judges and Prosecutors of the Republic of Srpska, and the Head of the Legal Affairs Department of “The Republic of Srpska Railways” (2008).

He has been a Senator of the e Republic of Srpska from January to May 2017. 

Milan Blagojević is a full-time Professor of the Constitutional Law and College Professor for the subjects Criminal Law and Criminal Procedural Law. He has been teaching Constitutional Law, Introduction to Law, Administrative Law, Criminal Law, Criminal Procedural Law and Major Legal Systems for 11 years at numerous higher education institutions of the Republic of Srpska. He is the author or co-author of 33 books from the field of law (author of 25 books and co-author of 8), and has written more than 70 scholarly and expert papers from the field of law which have been published in scholarly and professional journals in Banja Luka, Sarajevo, Doboj, Belgrade, Nis and Kotor. He is co-author of the first locally produced university textbook on  International Criminal Law, published in two editions. The monographs he authored include three practicums for court proceedings: Practicum in Criminal Procedural Law (two editions), Practicum in Civil Proceedings, and Practicum in Administrative Litigation, and he was also a co-author for two practicums: Litigation in Practice and Administrative Litigation in Practice. He took part in several scholarly conferences domestically and abroad. Eight of his legal monographs have been translated into the English language. 

He is co-author of six scholarly compendiums, including on "Crimes against humanity - normatively and in reality", issued in 2015 by the Faculty of law on University in Banja Luka; as well as "(Re)construction of social reality", issued in 2018 by Faculty of political sciences of the University in Banja Luka; and collection of scholarly essays "Introduction to Sharia Law", issued in 2020 by the Institute of Comparative Law in Belgrade.

Papers 
In addition to a large number of articles, he authored the following books: 

 Pravna priroda i položaj Brčko distrikta u Bosni i Hercegovini (2002) Legal character and position of the Brcko District within Bosnia and Herzegovina
 Načela, predmet i osnovni subjekti krivičnog postupka u Bosni i Hercegovini (2003) Principles, subject matter and key principles of criminal proceeding in Bosnia and Herzegovina
 Tehnologija ohaerizma (2004) Technology of the “OHR System”
 O pojmu lokalne samouprave i njenim zakonskim osnovama u Republici Srpskoj (2005) About the concept of local self-government and its legal basis in the Republic of Srpska
 Ogledi iz krivičnog procesnog prava (2005) Essays on Criminal Procedural Law
 Zbirka obrazaca iz krivičnog procesnog prava (2008) Collection of Criminal Procedural Law Forms
 Praktikum za krivično procesno pravo (2010) Practicum in Criminal Procedural Law
 Praktikum za parnični postupak (2010) Practicum in Civil Proceedings
 Pravni eseji – Knjiga značenja (2011) Legal essays – Book of definitions
 Pravna priroda Brčko distrikta deceniju poslije (2011) The Legal Character of the Brcko District a Decade Later
 Islamski konstitucionalizam na iranski način (2012) Islamic constitutionalism in Iranian way
 Ustavnost i zakonitost u upravnom sporu u Republici Srpskoj (2014) Constitutionality and legality in administrative disputes in the Republic of Srpska
 Praktikum za upravni spor (2014) Practicum in Administrative Litigation
 Neustavna retroaktivna primjena inkriminacije zločini protiv čovječnosti u praksi Suda BiH (2014), prvo izdanje Unconstitutional retroactive implementation of crimes against humanity charge in the practice of the Court of Bosnia and Herzegovina, first edition
 Neustavna retroaktivna primjena inkriminacije zločini protiv čovječnosti u praksi Suda BiH, drugo dopunjeno izdanje (2015) Unconstitutional retroactive implementation of crimes against humanity charge in the practice of the Court of Bosnia and Herzegovina, second revised edition
 Ustavni dekatlon (2016) Constitutional decathlon
 Politička anatomija jedne presude (2016) Political anatomy of a judgment
 Pravоsudna neistina (2017) Legal untruth
 Hrestomatija tehnologije ohaerizma (2018) Chrestomathy of the technology of the “OHR System”
 Zapisi o (ne)pravu (2018) Notes on (Ill)egality
 Fenomenologija (ne)prava (2019) Phenomenology of (Ill)egality
Ustavnopravna odbrana Republike Srpske (2021) Constitutional defense of the Republic of Srpska
Kriminal ohaerizma (2021) The Criminality of the OHR System
Osnovi opšteg ustavnog prava - udžbenik (2022) -  The Basics of General Constitutional Law - university textbook of constitutional law 

Milan Blagojević is co-author (with academician Miodrag N. Simović) of two editions of the university textbook Međunarodno krivično pravo (2007 and 2013). The 2007 edition is the first local university textbook on International Criminal Law written in the Republic of Srpska and Bosnia and Herzegovina. 

He is also a co-author (with Dr Tihomir Gligorić) of the book 

 Osvrt na nerazumijevanja Zakona o katastru Republike Srpske (2011) Review of misunderstandings of the Law on Cadastre of the Republic of Srpska

He is a co-author of the following books (with publicist Haso Tajić):

 Javne nabavke u upravnoj i sudskoj praksi (2012) Public procurement in administrative and judicial practice
 Parnica u praksi (2011) Practical litigation 
 Građansko i privredno pravo u praksi sudova u Bosni i Hercegovini (2013) Civil and commercial law in the jurisprudence of the courts of Bosnia and Herzegovina
 Odštetno pravo i pravo osiguranja u sudskoj praksi (2013) Indemnity and insurance law in court jurisprudence
 Upravni spor u praksi (2015) Administrative dispute in legal jurisprudence

References 

Serbian jurists
1965 births
Living people